Mero Best Friend is an Nepali romantic comedy movie based on the grounds of friendship and violence. The movie centers on the lives of two best friends played by Resh Maratha and Priyanka Karki. Originally Jharana Bajracharya was cast as the female lead but she was later replaced by Priyanka Karki. While this is Prasanna Poudel's second movie venture, Karki debuts into Kollywood with this movie. It also includes Bimlesh Adhikari and Keki Adhikari in a special appearance.

The first look of the movie was released on April 1, 2012.

References 

Nepalese romantic comedy films
2012 films